In mathematics (and more specifically geometry), a semicircle is a one-dimensional locus of points that forms half of a circle. It is a circular arc that measures 180° (equivalently,  radians, or a half-turn). It has only one line of symmetry (reflection symmetry). In non-technical usage, the term "semicircle" is sometimes used to refer to a half-disk, which is a two-dimensional geometric shape that also includes the diameter segment from one end of the arc to the other as well as all the interior points.

By Thales' theorem, any triangle inscribed in a semicircle with a vertex at each of the endpoints of the semicircle and the third vertex elsewhere on the semicircle is a right triangle, with a right angle at the third vertex. 

All lines intersecting the semicircle perpendicularly are concurrent at the center of the circle containing the given semicircle.

Uses

A semicircle can be used to construct the arithmetic and geometric means of two lengths using straight-edge and compass. For a semicircle with a diameter of a + b, the length of its radius is the arithmetic mean of a and b (since the radius is half of the diameter).

The geometric mean can be found by dividing the diameter into two segments of lengths a and b, and then connecting their common endpoint to the semicircle with a segment perpendicular to the diameter. The length of the resulting segment is the geometric mean. This can be proven by applying the Pythagorean theorem to three similar right triangles, each having as vertices the point where the perpendicular touches the semicircle and two of the three endpoints of the segments of lengths a and b.

The construction of the geometric mean can be used to transform any rectangle into a square of the same area, a problem called the quadrature of a rectangle. The side length of the square is the geometric mean of the side lengths of the rectangle. More generally, it is used as a lemma in a general method for transforming any polygonal shape into a similar copy of itself with the area of any other given polygonal shape.

Equation

The equation of a semicircle with midpoint  on the diameter between its endpoints and which is entirely concave from below is

If it is entirely concave from above, the equation is

Arbelos

An arbelos is a region in the plane bounded by three semicircles connected at the corners, all on the same side of a straight line (the baseline) that contains their diameters.

See also

Amphitheater
Archimedes' twin circles
Archimedes' quadruplets
Salinon
Wigner semicircle distribution

References

External links
Semicircle - Mathworld

Elementary geometry
es:Semicírculo